Love 86 (Hindi: लव Urdu) is a 1986 Bollywood romantic drama film directed by Esmayeel Shroff, starring Tanuja, Govinda, Rohan Kapoor, Farha Naaz and Neelam. It was a remake of the 1982 Tamil film  Ilanjodigal. This was Govinda's Debut Movie.

Cast
Tanuja as Laxmidevi
Rohan Kapoor as Omi
Farha Naaz as Leena
Neelam as Esha
Govinda as Vicky
Shafi Inamdar as Ramniwas Tilak
Satish Shah as Havaldar Sandu
Ravi Baswani as Havaldar Pandu
Johnny Lever as Uttam
Asrani as Hanuman
Birbal
Dinesh Hingoo as Surendra Nath
Rita Rani Kaul as Mrs. Surendra Nath
Guddi Maruti
Anjan Srivastav as Dr. Dilip Sen

Plot
Laxmidevi (Tanuja), a strict disciplinarian, wants her daughters, Leena (Farha Naaz) and Esha (Neelam Kothari), to marry brothers from a wealthy family, so that both girls can stay in the same household. But Leena and Esha fall in love with Omi (Rohan Kapoor) and Vicky (Govinda) respectively. The boys are poor orphans who have taken to petty crimes in order to survive. How the matter is resolved forms the rest of the story.

Music

References

External links 
 

1980s Hindi-language films
1986 films
1986 romantic drama films
Films scored by Laxmikant–Pyarelal
Films about religion
Indian romantic drama films